The spectacled parrotbill (Sinosuthora conspicillata) is a species of parrotbill bird in the family Paradoxornithidae. It is endemic to central China. Its natural habitats are temperate forests and subtropical or tropical moist montane forests.

References

Robson, C. (2007). Family Paradoxornithidae (Parrotbills) pp.  292–321 in; del Hoyo, J., Elliott, A. & Christie, D.A. eds. Handbook of the Birds of the World, Vol. 12. Picathartes to Tits and Chickadees. Lynx Edicions, Barcelona.

spectacled parrotbill
Birds of Central China
Endemic birds of China
spectacled parrotbill
Taxonomy articles created by Polbot